A speed bump is a bump on a road designed to slow traffic.

Speed bump may also refer to:

 Speed Bump, a comic strip by Dave Coverly
 A skin rash that may result from injecting methamphetamine
 A type of task assigned to teams on the reality TV series The Amazing Race